Stanisław Niwiński (8 May 1932 – 4 May 2002) was a Polish actor. He appeared in more than 45 films and television shows between 1961 and 1992.

Selected filmography
 Spotkanie w "Bajce" (1962)
 Black Wings (1963)
 Katastrofa (1965)
 Hubal (1973)

References

External links

1932 births
2002 deaths
Polish male film actors
Male actors from Warsaw